Estadio 10 de Diciembre is a multi-use stadium in the Mexican town of Jasso.  It is currently used mostly for football matches and is the home stadium of Cruz Azul Hidalgo.  The stadium holds 7,761 people and opened in 1963.

References

10 de Diciembre